Dean "Dino" Bandiera (1 January 1926 – 13 October 2020) was a Canadian football player who played for the Montreal Alouettes, Saskatchewan Roughriders, Winnipeg Blue Bombers and Calgary Stampeders. He was an alumnus of St. Michael's College, Toronto. Bandiera retired from football in 1955 when he was "fired" by the Calgary Stampeders for "football misbehaviour". It was alleged that Bandiera divulged information during a game to the winning opposing team regarding the Stampeders' plays.

References

1926 births
Calgary Stampeders players
Canadian football guards
Canadian sportspeople of Italian descent
2020 deaths
Montreal Alouettes players
Players of Canadian football from Ontario
Saskatchewan Roughriders players
Sportspeople from Timmins
Winnipeg Blue Bombers players